Thomas Griffin (1773 – October 7, 1837) was an eighteenth and nineteenth century politician, planter, lawyer and judge from Virginia.

Early and family life
Born in Yorktown, Virginia to Dr. Corbin Griffin and his wife. His father was a prominent local patriot during the American Revolutionary War: as a member of the York County Committee of Safety (1775-1776), and then as surgeon in the Virginia line. Meanwhile, young Thomas remained in the Hampton Roads area and received a private education suitable to his class, then studied law. He married his cousin Mary, daughter of prominent lawyer and patriot, then U.S. District Judge Cyrus Griffin.

Career
After being admitted to the Virginia bar, Griffin practiced law, as well as operated a plantation using enslaved labor. In the last census before his death, he owned 29 enslaved people, and his household also included a free Black woman of between 24 and 35 years old.

Voters in York County first elected Griffin as one of their two representatives in the Virginia House of Delegates in 1793, and he won re-election each year until 1800.

During this part-time legislative service, Griffin also accepted an appointment as a justice of the court of oyer and terminer on October 17, 1796, serving until 1810.

In 1802, Congressman John Stratton having announced his retirement, Griffin won election as a Federalist to the United States House of Representatives in 1802, serving from 1803 to 1805. Democratic Republican Burwell Bassettdefeated him in 1804 (and would win re-election several times

He was then appointed chief justice of the Court of Quarter Sessions in Yorktown on September 1, 1805, serving until 1810 when he became a justice of the York County Court, serving as this until 1812.

During the War of 1812, British ships threatened the Hampton Roads area. Griffin served as a major of Infantry, and was second in command during the Battle of Hampton.

After the war, Griffin again became a justice of the court of oyer and terminer, this time as chairman of the court, serving from 1814 to 1820.

In 1819, voters again elected Griffin as one of their representatives in the Virginia House of Delegates, and re-elected him, so he served from 1819 to 1823. He again won election and re-election from 1827 to 1830, but following the Virginia Constitutional Convention of 1829-1830, the Tidewater area lost representatives and more were allocated to western Virginia, so the York County district was merged with neighboring James City County.

Death and legacy
Griffin died at "The Mansion" near Yorktown, Virginia on October 7, 1837.

References

1773 births
1837 deaths
Members of the Virginia House of Delegates
Virginia lawyers
Virginia state court judges
People from Virginia in the War of 1812
Federalist Party members of the United States House of Representatives from Virginia
18th-century American lawyers
19th-century American lawyers
People from Yorktown, Virginia